Marko Kovač (born 6 January 1987) is a German-Croatian footballer who plays as a midfielder for SV Breuningsweiler.

References

External links
 
 Marko Kovač on FuPa.net

1987 births
Living people
People from Böblingen
Sportspeople from Stuttgart (region)
Footballers from Baden-Württemberg
Association football midfielders
German footballers
Croatian footballers
Stuttgarter Kickers II players
Stuttgarter Kickers players
SGV Freiberg players
3. Liga players